Gavmishban (also Romanized as Gāvmīshbān; also known as Gāmīshbān) is a village in Howmeh Rural District, in the Central District of Masal County, Gilan Province, Iran. At the 2006 census, its population was 368, in 93 families.

References 

Populated places in Masal County